Beniamina Tinga (born ?) was an I-Kiribati politician. He was Minister of Finance from 1994 to 2003. Tinga was sworn in as Vice President of Kiribati on 17 November 2000, following the death of his predecessor, Tewareka Tentoa, earlier in the month. He served as vice president under former president Teburoro Tito until 2003. In 2018 he was the 6th richest person from Kiribati. 

Tinga is from Nikunau. He is the father of 2012 presidential candidate, Rimeta Beniamina.

References

Year of birth missing (living people)
Vice-presidents of Kiribati
Finance ministers of Kiribati
Members of the House of Assembly (Kiribati)
People from the Gilbert Islands
Living people
21st-century I-Kiribati politicians